The 1971 Singapore Open, also known as the 1971 Singapore Open Badminton Championships, took place from 6 to 10 October 1971 at the Singapore Badminton Hall in Singapore.

Venue
Singapore Badminton Hall

Final results

References 

Singapore Open (badminton)
1971 in badminton
1971 in Singaporean sport